Resurrection was thought to be a lost 1927 Hollywood adaptation of Leo Tolstoy's 1899 novel Resurrection.  Filmmaker Edwin Carewe adapted the book to a feature-length silent production starring Dolores del Río and featuring an appearance by Ilya Tolstoy who co-wrote the script.  In 1931, Edwin Carewe directed an all-talking remake of this film starred by Lupe Vélez.

Plot
Katyusha, a country girl, is seduced and abandoned by Prince Dimitry. Dimitry finds himself, years later, on a jury trying the same Katyusha for a crime he now realizes his actions drove her to. He follows her to imprisonment in Siberia, intent on redeeming her and himself as well.

Cast
 Dolores del Río as Katyusha Maslova
 Rod La Rocque as Prince Dimitry Ivanich
 Lucy Beaumont as Aunt Sophya
 Vera Lewis as Aunt Marya
 Marc McDermott as Major Schoenboch
 Clarissa Selwynne as Princess Olga Ivanovitch Nekhludof
 Eve Southern as Princess Sonia Korchagin
 Ilya Tolstoy as The Old Philosopher
 Bobby White - (uncredited)

References
Cited with approval in Frankel, Viktor E., "Man's Search for Meaning," first published in 1946 in Germany under the title Ein Psycholog erlebt das Konzentrationslager.

External links

 
 

1927 films
Films based on Resurrection
American black-and-white films
American silent feature films
Films directed by Edwin Carewe
1927 romantic drama films
American romantic drama films
Films set in Russia
Rediscovered American films
1920s rediscovered films
1920s American films
Silent romantic drama films
Silent American drama films